Every Moment: The Best of Joy Williams is the fourth album by Christian music artist Joy Williams. It includes her greatest hits, including "Hide", her biggest single on Christian radio to date.  It also features a new song ("Any More Sure") and her song "Here With Us" from the compilation Christmas album Come Let Us Adore Him. It was released on September 5, 2006.

Track listing

Singles
"Any More Sure"

Notes
The song "By Surprise" is slightly different on this album, than it is on the album By Surprise.

References

Joy Williams (singer) albums
2006 greatest hits albums